Hermetia anthidium is a species of soldier fly in the family Stratiomyidae.

Distribution
Panama.

References

Stratiomyidae
Insects described in 1967
Diptera of North America
Endemic fauna of Panama